The 1981–82 season was Liverpool Football Club's 90th season in existence and their 20th consecutive season in the First Division. After finishing fifth the previous season, Liverpool came back and won their thirteenth league title. They also won the Football League Cup for the second successive season, beating Tottenham Hotspur 3-1 at Wembley Stadium.

However, Liverpool were decisively beaten by Flamengo at the 1981 Intercontinental Cup final. Neither did they regain the European Cup, having been knocked out by CSKA Sofia in the quarter-finals and surprisingly being knocked out by Second Division Chelsea in the fifth round of the FA Cup.

It was also a season with major changes in the team, as many of the players who won the trophies over the previous seasons were being replaced by players who would go on to be part of the team that remained successful for the rest of the decade.  Players such as Bruce Grobbelaar, Mark Lawrenson, Ian Rush, Ronnie Whelan and Craig Johnston came into the team during the season and would make their mark on changing the side, that would go forward into the decade.

Squad

Goalkeepers
  Steve Ogrizovic
  Bruce Grobbelaar

Defenders
  Phil Neal
  Alan Hansen
  Phil Thompson
  Alan Kennedy
  Richard Money
  Mark Lawrenson

Midfielders
  Craig Johnston
  Sammy Lee
  Ray Kennedy
  Terry McDermott
  Kevin Sheedy
  Graeme Souness
  Ronnie Whelan
  Steve Nicol

Attackers
  David Fairclough
  Kenny Dalglish
  Howard Gayle
  David Johnson
  Ian Rush

League table

Results

First Division

FA Cup

Football League Cup

League Cup Final

European Cup

Intercontinental Cup

References
  LFC History.net – Games for the 1981–82 season
Liverweb - Games for the 1981-82 season

Liverpool F.C. seasons
Liverpool
English football championship-winning seasons